The Attorney General of the British Virgin Islands is the principal legal adviser to the Government of the British Virgin Islands. Under the Constitution of the British Virgin Islands the Attorney General sits ex officio in both the House of Assembly of the British Virgin Islands and in the Cabinet of the British Virgin Islands, but is not permitted to vote in either.  The Attorney General also sits on the Committee for the Prerogative of Mercy and on the National Security Council.  

The Attorney General is supported by two senior law officers: the Solicitor General (in relation to civil matters) and the Director of Public Prosecutions (in relation to criminal matters).  When appearing in court, by convention the Attorney General sits one row in from the row reserved for King's Counsel.

, the Attorney General is Dawn Smith.

History 

The office traces its origins back to the reintroduction of democracy in the British Virgin Islands pursuant to the 1950 general election.  At that time the Legislative Council (as the House of Assembly was then known) had to look to the Attorney General of the Leeward Islands for support.  This was regarded as unsatisfactory and following the 1954 general election Herman Besson was appointed to the title of Legal Assistant to the Legislative Council.  In 1959 the title of the office was changed to Crown Attorney, and subsequent to the introduction of Ministerial Government following the 1967 general election the office was titled Attorney General.

Qualifications

Since 2007 in order to be qualified to be appointed as Attorney General a person must be eligible to be admitted as a lawyer in the British Virgin Islands, and must have not less than 10 years experience practising law. However, this was not always the case, and various past Attorneys General were either not admitted in the British Virgin Islands and in some cases were not even eligible to be admitted in the British Virgin Islands.

By law only a Belonger to the Virgin Islands may be appointed to the office of Attorney General unless, in the opinion of the Judicial and Legal Services Commission, there is no such person who is suitably qualified and able and willing to be so appointed. In practice, almost all the Attorneys General appointed since 2007 have been non-Belongers, and only two Attorneys General in the history of the British Virgin Islands was a belonger at the time they were appointed (Dancia Penn, and the current Attorney General, Dawn Smith).

List of attorneys general of the British Virgin Islands

A total of 27 persons have been appointed to the office (including as Crown Attorney or Legal Assistant prior to 1967, and persons who were appointed as acting Attorney General), of whom 20 have been men and seven have been women.  Three have been Queen's Counsel (although two were appointed to the rank during office), and the remaining 24 have been from the Outer bar or solicitors during their time as Attorney General. The longest serving Attorney General to date has been Cherno Jallow, who served just under eight years (including time as acting Attorney General).

For attorneys general prior to 1954 see Attorney General of the Leeward Islands

See also

 Justice ministry
 Politics of the British Virgin Islands

Footnotes

British Virgin Islands law
Government of the British Virgin Islands